Roman Týce (born 7 May 1977) is a Czech former professional football player. He played club football in the Czech Republic and Germany, as a defender and defensive midfielder. Týce played internationally for the Czech Republic at Euro 2004.

Club career
Týce made his debut for Sparta Prague at the age of 17. He later played for FC Slovan Liberec before heading to Germany.

In Germany he signed for TSV 1860 Munich, becoming club captain. Týce suffered a knee injury in 2002, leaving the Bundesliga game against VfL Wolfsburg after having scored a goal. He was later diagnosed with torn ligaments in his right knee. He suffered a similar injury in 2006 with his left knee.

Týce left 1860 Munich in 2007, joining compatriot and former teammate Michal Kolomazník at SpVgg Unterhaching.

International career
Týce captained his nation in the 2000 UEFA European Under-21 Championship, a tournament at which the Czech Republic reached the final before finishing second behind Italy.

Týce was involved in the Czech Republic's participation in the 2000 Summer Olympics tournament as captain. Before the tournament he stated his desire for his country to win a medal in the competition. The team was unsuccessful however, being eliminated at the group stage without winning a match.

He took part in Euro 2004, playing the whole of the group stage match against Germany. It was, however, the only match he participated in during the tournament.

Style of play
He could play as a defender or defensive midfielder. His versatility allowed him to play at left back, right back, or in various positions in the midfield.

Personal life
Týce was born to father Marcel and mother Alena. He lived in the village of Černiv and went to primary school in the town of Libochovice until moving to Prague to become involved with Sparta Prague at the age of 13.

Career statistics

International

References

External links
 
 
 
 

Living people
1977 births
People from Roudnice nad Labem
Association football midfielders
Association football defenders
Czech footballers
Czech Republic under-21 international footballers
Czech Republic international footballers
Czech First League players
AC Sparta Prague players
FC Slovan Liberec players
TSV 1860 Munich players
SpVgg Unterhaching players
Expatriate footballers in Germany
Bundesliga players
2. Bundesliga players
3. Liga players
Footballers at the 2000 Summer Olympics
Olympic footballers of the Czech Republic
UEFA Euro 2004 players
Czech expatriate sportspeople in Germany
Sportspeople from the Ústí nad Labem Region